was a Japanese novelist. He wrote several novels including Enrai and Dogen-Zenji, about the devout Buddhist who founded the Soto Sect of Zen Buddhism in 1227.

He was also known for his environmental work. In 1995 he founded the Ashio Green Growing Association, a non-profit organization that helps plant trees at the abandoned Ashio Copper Mine.

Selected works in English 
 Distant Thunder (Enrai, 遠雷), Charles E. Tuttle (1999).  Translated by Lawrence J. Howell and Hikaru Morimoto
 Frozen Dreams: Based on a True Story (Hidaka, 日高), Peter Owen (2012).  Translated by Philip Gabriel.

References

External links
 Synopsis of Frozen Dreams (Hidaka) at JLPP (Japanese Literature Publishing Project) 

1948 births
2010 deaths
20th-century Japanese novelists
21st-century Japanese novelists